The 1938 Michigan State Normal Hurons football team represented Michigan State Normal College (later renamed Eastern Michigan University) during the 1938 college football season. In their 17th season under head coach Elton Rynearson, the Hurons compiled a record of 6–1–1 and outscored their opponents by a combined total of 166 to 36.  George J. Miller and Fred J. Gruber were the team captains. The team played its home games at Briggs Field on the school's campus in Ypsilanti, Michigan.

Schedule

References

Michigan State Normal
Eastern Michigan Eagles football seasons
Michigan State Normal Hurons football